In Greek mythology, Dryas (Ancient Greek: Δρύας, gen. Δρύαντος, from δρῦς "oak") was a lord from Calydon who was also one of the famous Calydonian hunters.

Family 
Dryas was a son of Ares and a brother of Tereus. But according to Hyginus' Fabulae, he was also called the son of Iapetus ("the piercer"), probably an epithet of Ares.

Mythology 
In the account of the Fabulae by Hyginus, Tereus, having heard the prophecy that his son was to be killed by the hand of a relative and falsely believing that it was Dryas whom the oracle indicated, murdered the innocent man (whereas the son was actually murdered by Procne)."Tereus, son of Mars [Ares], a Thracian . . . thinking that his brother Dryas was plotting his son's death, he killed the innocent man."

Notes

References 

 Apollodorus, The Library with an English Translation by Sir James George Frazer, F.B.A., F.R.S. in 2 Volumes, Cambridge, MA, Harvard University Press; London, William Heinemann Ltd. 1921. ISBN 0-674-99135-4. Online version at the Perseus Digital Library. Greek text available from the same website.
 Gaius Julius Hyginus, Fabulae from The Myths of Hyginus translated and edited by Mary Grant. University of Kansas Publications in Humanistic Studies. Online version at the Topos Text Project.

Children of Ares
Demigods in classical mythology
Aetolian characters in Greek mythology